The Minneapolis YMCA Central Building is a 12-story YMCA building in downtown Minneapolis, Minnesota listed on the National Register of Historic Places.  It is built in the Gothic Revival style, making it stand out from other buildings.  The Gothic styling was chosen to emphasize the vertical mass of the structure and to make it appear as a powerful corporate symbol.  The styling also brought a symbolic association with church architecture, making it fit into the YMCA's value system.

The building was converted into a 121-unit apartment complex in 1994.  It is located adjacent to LaSalle Plaza, a 30-story office building that includes the current, modern Minneapolis YMCA location.

References

External links
 

Apartment buildings in Minnesota
Clubhouses on the National Register of Historic Places in Minnesota
Gothic Revival architecture in Minnesota
National Register of Historic Places in Minneapolis
Residential buildings completed in 1919
Residential skyscrapers in Minneapolis
YMCA buildings in the United States